Greece competed at the 2022 World Games held in Birmingham, United States from 7 to 17 July 2022. Athletes representing Greece won one gold medal, three silver medals and four bronze medals. The country finished in 34th place in the medal table.

Medalists

Competitors
The following is the list of number of competitors in the Games.

Finswimming

Eight swimmers represented Greece in finswimming; in total, they won four medals.

Men

Women

Ju-jitsu

Greece won two medals in ju-jitsu.

Karate

Greece won one medal in karate.

Men

Women

Muaythai

Greece competed in muaythai.

Parkour

Greece won one gold medal in parkour.

Water skiing

Filippos Kyprios was scheduled to represent Greece in water skiing. He did not start in the event.

References

Nations at the 2022 World Games
2022
World Games